Edward B. Lynch was an American football player and coach.  He served as the head football coach at Carleton College in 1931.  Lynch played college football as an end at Dartmouth College from 1920 to 1922.  He served as an assistant football coach at the University of Minnesota under head coach Clarence Spears from 1926 to 1929.  In 1945, Lynch was appointed as an account executive for Merrill Lynch in Minneapolis.

Head coaching record

Football

References

Year of birth missing
Year of death missing
American football ends
Carleton Knights football coaches
Dartmouth Big Green football coaches
Dartmouth Big Green football players
Iowa Hawkeyes football coaches
Minnesota Golden Gophers football coaches
Wisconsin Badgers football coaches
Merrill (company) people